Modesto Sandoval (born 12 February 1941) is a Paraguayan former goalkeeper. He now lives in Luque and he is the goalkeeper trainer for Cerro Porteño.

Professional career

He initiated his career in the Club Sportivo Luqueño from 1960 to 1964 having a lot of spectacular saves when he played for the inferiors and a good future for his career. After his great reputation in Luque he was sent to the Club Nacional neighbourhood of Barrio Obrero (Asunción) from 1965 to 1968.

Then he passed to Venezuela in the Club Deportivo Galicia from 1969 to 1972 where he won his first title. After his good saves and unmatchable skills he was bought and transferred to the Deportivo Italia where he just played on the year of 1973 and won his second title. And his last and most successful club was in the Estudiantes de Mérida FC from 1974 to 1979 where he was once more champion at the Copa de Venezuela in 1975.

After professional career 

After his professional career Sandoval trained a lot of notable goalkeepers in different clubs. Right now he still trains goalkeepers and works in Cerro Porteño. The most notable are Sergio Goycochea, Faryd Aly Mondragón both in Cerro Porteño, Jose Luis Chilavert in Sportivo Luqueño and Justo Villar in Sol de America and in the Club Libertad. Sandoval is the only trainer that until now formed and trained in youth the three national team goalkeepers of Paraguay. Justo Villar, Aldo Bobadilla, and Diego Barreto. Another notable experience of Sandoval was in the qualifying round for the 1982 Spain soccer World Cup where he trained Ever Hugo Almeida, Roberto Fernández, and Manuel Battaglia.

Goalkeepers he trained from youth level:

Paraguay
 Diego Barreto
 Roberto Junior Fernández
 Justo Villar
 Jose Luis Chilavert
 Danilo Aceval
 Aldo Bobadilla

Goalkeepers he trained:

Argentina
 Sergio Goycochea
 Ezequiel Medrán
 Hilario Navarro

Colombia
 Faryd Aly Mondragón

Titles

Champion with the Deportivo Galicia in 1969, Deportivo Italia in 1972,and Estudiantes de Mérida FC in 1975.

References

External links
 
 
 
 

Paraguayan footballers
Living people
Paraguayan expatriate footballers
Sportivo Luqueño players
Club Nacional footballers
Association football goalkeepers
Paraguay international footballers
Deportivo Italia players
Expatriate footballers in Venezuela
Sportspeople from Luque
1941 births
Estudiantes de Mérida players